North Hardin High School, located in Radcliff, Kentucky, United  States, has a student population of approximately 1,600.  The school, a part of Hardin County Public Schools, was founded in 1962. The athletics teams are known as the Trojans. The school is also known for its involvement in the 1988 Carrollton bus disaster, which resulted in improvements to the safety of school buses.

Academics
East Hardin has been accredited by Cognia (or its predecessors) since 1982.

Notable alumni
Nathan Adcock (Class of 2006), major league baseball player, 2011, Kansas City Royals, RHP
Dana Canedy ( Class of 1983) author of the best-selling memoir A Journal for Jordan and Pulitzer Prize winning journalist for the New York Times.
Todd Perry (Class of 1988), professional football player from 1993 to 2003 with the Chicago Bears and the Miami Dolphins
Howard Stidham, NFL player
Andre' Woodson (Class of 2003), starting quarterback for University of Kentucky 2005–07; assistant football coach at UK

References

External links

Educational institutions established in 1962
Public high schools in Kentucky
Schools in Hardin County, Kentucky